Raphaël Van Dorpe (1910–1996) was a Belgian architect. His work was part of the architecture event in the art competition at the 1932 Summer Olympics.

References

1910 births
1996 deaths
20th-century Belgian architects
Olympic competitors in art competitions
Architects from Ghent